Mike Mohring may refer to:

 Mike Mohring (politician) (born 1971), German politician
 Mike Mohring (American football) (born 1974), American football defensive tackle